Padgett is a surname, and may refer to:

 Cliff Padgett (1879–1951), American boat builder
 Dirk Padgett, American lawyer 
 Don Padgett (1911–1980), American baseball player
 Doug Padgett (born 1934), English cricketer
 Ernie Padgett (1899–1957), American baseball player
 Guy Padgett (born 1977), American politician
 Hubert Padgett (born 1931), British cricketer
 John Padgett (1860–1943), cricketer 
 Joy Padgett (born 1947), American politician
 Keith Padgett, Falkland Islands politician
 Lemuel P. Padgett (1855–1922), American politician
 Lewis Padgett, pseudonym of authors Henry Kuttner and C. L. Moore
 Marty Padgett, American journalist
 Ron Padgett (born 1942), American poet, essayist, fiction writer, and translator
 Scott Padgett (born 1976), American basketball player and coach
 Travis Padgett (born 1986), American track and field athlete 
 Padgett Powell (born 1952), American novelist
 An American family of basketball people:
 Jim Padgett (1930–2009), coach
 Pete Padgett (born 1954), Jim's son, player and coach
 David Padgett (born 1985), Pete's son, player and coach

See also
 Paget